Gymnastics events have been staged at the Olympic Games since 1896, with women competing for the time at the 1928 Olympic Games.  Chinese female artistic gymnasts first competed at the 1984 Olympic Games and have competed at every subsequent Olympic Games.  China was stripped of their team bronze medal in 2000 after it was discovered that one of their gymnasts was underage.

Gymnasts

Medalists

Gallery

See also 
 China women's national gymnastics team

References

China
gymnasts
Olympic